Acorn Ridge or Acornridge is an unincorporated community in Stoddard County, in the U.S. state of Missouri. 
The community is on Missouri Route J, approximately seven miles west of Bloomfield.

History
A post office called Acorn Ridge was established in 1860, and remained in operation until 1909. The community was named for the acorn oak timber near the original town site.  A variant spelling was "Acornridge".

References

Unincorporated communities in Stoddard County, Missouri
Unincorporated communities in Missouri
1860 establishments in Missouri